Tanaz Bhathena is a Canadian author. She has written A Girl Like That and The Beauty of the Moment.

Early life 
Bhathena was born in Mumbai, and later lived in Saudi Arabia. She moved to Canada when she was a teenager.

Bibliography 
A Girl Like That (2018)
The Beauty of the Moment (2019)
Hunted by the Sky (2020)
Rising Like a Storm (2021)

Accolades 
 2018 – Nominated for the 2019 White Pine Award for A Girl Like That
 2019 – Nominated for the 2020 White Pine Award for The Beauty of the Moment
 2021 – Winner of the 2021 White Pine Award for Hunted by the Sky

References 

21st-century Canadian novelists
21st-century Canadian women writers
Canadian writers of young adult literature
Canadian women novelists
Living people
Year of birth missing (living people)